Still is the seventh album by the duo BeBe & CeCe Winans, and was released in October 2009 on Malaco Records. It rose to No. 2 on the Billboard Top R&B/Hip-Hop Albums chart and No. 12 on the Billboard 200 chart.

Overview
Still won a Grammy Award for Best Contemporary R&B Gospel Album. The track "Grace" won in the category of Best Gospel Performance.

Samples
"Reason to Dance" samples "Wanna Be Startin' Somethin'" by Michael Jackson. "Never Thought" contains a sample of Earth, Wind & Fire's "That's the Way of the World".

Track listing
Adapted from album's text.

Charts

Weekly charts

Year-end charts

References

2009 albums
BeBe & CeCe Winans albums